Mankowitz is a surname. Notable people with the surname include:

 Gered Mankowitz (born 1946), English photographer
 Wolf Mankowitz (1924–1998), English writer, playwright, and screenwriter